Phiala crassistriga is a moth in the family Eupterotidae. It was described by Embrik Strand in 1911. It is found in the Democratic Republic of Congo (North Kivu), Malawi and Tanzania.

References

Moths described in 1911
Eupterotinae